Meridiotroctes is a genus of beetles in the family Cerambycidae, containing the following species:

 Meridiotroctes bicristata Machado & Monne, 2009
 Meridiotroctes meridionale Martins & Galileo, 2007
 Meridiotroctes truncata Galileo & Martins, 2011

References

Acanthoderini